Maria Alevizou (born 15 November 1968, Kalamata, Peloponnese) is a retired Greek rhythmic gymnast.

She competed for Greece in the rhythmic gymnastics all-around competition at the 1988 Summer Olympics in Seoul. She was 21st in the qualification round and didn't advance to the final.

References

External links 
 

1976 births
Living people
Greek rhythmic gymnasts
Gymnasts at the 1988 Summer Olympics
Olympic gymnasts of Greece
Sportspeople from Kalamata
Sport in Peloponnese (region)